Joseph John Royal, Jr. (April 9, 1912 – March, 1975) was an American baseball outfielder in the Negro leagues. He played from 1937 to 1944 with several teams.

References

External links
 and Baseball-Reference Black Baseball stats and Seamheads

1912 births
1975 deaths
Cleveland Bears players
Indianapolis Athletics players
Jacksonville Red Caps players
New York Black Yankees players
Baseball players from Atlanta
20th-century African-American sportspeople
Baseball outfielders